Nicklas Frenderup (born 14 December 1992) is a professional footballer who plays as goalkeeper for Ranheim. Born and raised in Denmark, he represents Trinidad and Tobago internationally.

Club career
After tenures in the Danish third and fourth-tier clubs Ringsted, Rishøj, Greve and Egedal, he moved to Norway in 2015 to start a career there. He signed for third-tier Florø and eventually secured promotion to the 2017 1. divisjon. In mid-2018 he was signed by fellow second-tier club Sandnes Ulf. After the 2018 1. divisjon concluded, he returned to Denmark and HB Køge, only to join Norwegian third-tier club Stjørdals-Blink in the summer of 2019. They too won promotion.

International career
Born to a Danish father and a Trinidadian mother. In November 2018, Frenderup received his first call-up to the Trinidad and Tobago national team. He made his international debut a year later, coming on as a substitute in 15-0 win over Anguilla.

References

External links

1992 births
Living people
Footballers from Copenhagen
Citizens of Trinidad and Tobago through descent
Trinidad and Tobago footballers
Trinidad and Tobago international footballers
Danish men's footballers
Trinidad and Tobago people of Danish descent
Danish people of Trinidad and Tobago descent
Sportspeople of Trinidad and Tobago descent
Greve Fodbold players
Florø SK players
Sandnes Ulf players
HB Køge players
IL Stjørdals-Blink players
Norwegian First Division players
Association football goalkeepers
Trinidad and Tobago expatriate footballers
Danish expatriate men's footballers
Expatriate footballers in Norway
Danish expatriate sportspeople in Norway